Odd Fellows Lodge, also known as Old First Presbyterian Church, is a historic building in Bel Air, Maryland, United States.  It was built in 1852, and is a one-story, temple-form, Greek Revival style brick building above a high basement.  The front facade features a projecting portico supported by four Doric order columns.  It was originally built for the First Presbyterian Church, who moved to a new church in 1881 and leased it to the Odd Fellows Lodge.

It was listed on the National Register of Historic Places in 1975.

References

External links
, including photo from 1979, Maryland Historical Trust

Odd Fellows buildings in Maryland
Properties of religious function on the National Register of Historic Places in Maryland
Clubhouses on the National Register of Historic Places in Maryland
Churches completed in 1852
19th-century Presbyterian church buildings in the United States
Buildings and structures in Harford County, Maryland
National Register of Historic Places in Harford County, Maryland
1852 establishments in Maryland